Town Center at Lake Forest Park (formerly Lake Forest Park Towne Centre) is a multi-purpose shopping center that also serves as the community hub for the city of Lake Forest Park, Washington.  Built in 1964, the center is located on the eastern side of Lake Forest Park, on the western shore of Lake Washington in a suburb of Seattle on Bothell Way NE beside City Hall.  The southeast side of the center abuts the Burke-Gilman Trail.

Town Center at Lake Forest Park "is a true community center that draws a regional crowd and is home to several unique and organic local stores which collectively cater to the educated customer, thus serving as a daily destination. Friends of Third Place Commons offers over 1,200 community events throughout the calendar year at Lake Forest Park Towne Centre, attracting patrons from all over the Puget Sound region." The Third Place Commons is a non-profit organization that books community events through public donation.

The center was renovated in 1995 to increase pedestrian traffic and since Madison Marquette's requisition in 2006, has been undergoing smaller renovations, including the addition of a Ross Dress for Less and a Planet Fitness which both opened in 2011.

Town Center at Lake Forest Park is anchored by Third Place Books, Albertson's grocery store, Rite Aid, Ross Dress for Less, and Planet Fitness and features almost  of gross leasable area on its 18 acres.  Around 40 tenants are currently open and operating at Lake Forest Park Towne Centre. Along with the bookstore, Third Place Books has a food court and coffee stand.

Third Place Books, a general interest bookseller, is one of the tenants of the center and serves as a community center for Lake Forest Park hosting free public events and other community activities. The bookstore provides access to print on demand books via the Espresso Book Machine.

Each Sunday, starting in May and ending in October, the Third Place Commons Farmers Market is held in the LFPTC parking lot.

References

External links
 
 

Shopping malls established in 1964
Shopping malls in King County, Washington
1964 establishments in Washington (state)